Tawag ng Tanghalan Celebrity Champions was a celebrity singing competition currently aired as a segment for the Month-Long Anniversary Special of the noontime show It's Showtime.

Hosts and judges
Jaya, Dulce, Ogie Alcasid, Yeng Constantino and Louie Ocampo returned as the head judges for the celebrity edition, with Zsa Zsa Padilla, Karylle, Karla Estrada, K Brosas, Nyoy Volante, Erik Santos, Kyla, Jed Madela and Randy Santiago returned as guest judges for the celebrity edition.

Vhong Navarro, Anne Curtis, Amy Perez-Castillo and Vice Ganda served as hosts for the celebrity edition, with Ryan Bang, Jhong Hilario, Teddy Corpuz and Jugs Jugueta serving as co-hosts as well as Gong.

Prizes 
Here are the prizes for the first Celebrity Grand Champion.
 cash
Recording Contract from TNT Records
Custom In-Ear Monitors from FlipEars
TNT Trophy designed by Toym Imao

Contenders

Batch 1

Batch 2

Batch 3

Daily Rounds 
Color Key:

Results Details:

Ang Huling Tapatan (Grand Finals) 

The grand finals was held on ABS-CBN Studio 3 instead of large venues.

Summary of Grand Finalists 

Contender's Information

Results Details

Grand Final Details 
Color Key:

Ethel Booba emerged as the first-ever Tawag ng Tanghalan Celebrity Grand Champion.

Elimination table 
Color Key:

Results Details

References
Notes

Scores

Sources

External links
 Tawag ng Tanghalan

Tawag ng Tanghalan seasons
2019 Philippine television seasons